Wellington Fountain is a listed heritage structure in front of Maharashtra Police Headquarters at Shyamaprasad Mukherjee Chowk in Fort, Mumbai, which is part of Mumbai's Victorian ensemble that is a UNESCO World Heritage Site. It was erected in 1865 to commemorate the visits of Arthur Wellesley, 1st Duke of Wellington, who came to India in 1801 and 1804.

The fountain is built in Neoclassical style with basalt. It has two tiers and the lower tier has eight bas reliefs depicting the duke's victories. The top tier is made out of metal and features cast iron leaves. There are Latin inscriptions on the fountain that celebrate the achievements of the duke.

In 2016-17, a team led by the conservation architect Vikas Dilawari restored the fountain, and multiple layers of paint were removed from the basalt structure. However, the water engineering system was intact at the time of restoration. The project was funded by Mahindra and Mahindra Ltd, and was awarded the Honourable Mention under the UNESCO Asia-Pacific Awards for Cultural Heritage Conservation.

References

External links
A walk around Wellington Circle - Google Arts & Culture

Fountains in Mumbai
1865 sculptures
Buildings and structures completed in 1865
Stone sculptures
Outdoor sculptures in India
UNESCO Asia-Pacific Heritage Awards winners
The Victorian and Art Deco Ensemble of Mumbai